Lake Washington Floating Bridge may refer to the following crossings of Lake Washington between Seattle and its eastern suburbs:

 Lacey V. Murrow Memorial Bridge (opened 1940, rebuilt 1993), carries eastbound lanes of Interstate 90
 Homer M. Hadley Memorial Bridge (opened 1989), carries westbound lanes of Interstate 90 
 Evergreen Point Floating Bridge (opened 2016), carries Washington State Route 520
 Evergreen Point Floating Bridge (1963) (opened 1963, closed 2016), the original Washington State Route 520 crossing